The 2011 Manx Grand Prix Festival were held between Saturday 20 August and Friday 2 September 2011 on the 37.733-mile Mountain Course.

The Blue Riband event of the Manx Grand Prix Race week was won by Andrew Brady after victory in the 2011 Senior Manx Grand Prix at an average speed of 113.788 mph and also completing an important double after winning the Junior Manx Grand Prix held in poor weather conditions. The 3 lap (113.00 miles) Newcomers Race was won by Wayne Hamilton at an average speed of 112.022 mph and Gavin Lupton winning the 400 cc Class B Newcomers race. The Isle of Man TT competitor Ryan Farquhar completed a hattrick of victories after winning the 350 cc Junior Classic Race, the 500 cc Classic Race riding a 499 cc Paton and the Classic Superbike Race. The 250 cc Lightweight Classic Race was won by Barry Davidson and the Junior Classic Race by Roy Richardson raising his tally to 9 victories in the Manx Grand Prix. The Formula Classic Race was won by Mark Parrett the only finisher in the class from 4 starters. The combined 650 cc Supertwin/Lightweight Race proved to be a double win for local Isle of Man competitors with Dave Moffitt winning the inaugural Supertwin Race and Billy Smith the 400 cc Lightweight Race. The 2010 Lightweight Manx Grand Prix winner Neil Kent crashed fatally at Greeba Bridge during practice for the Manx Grand Prix. After winning the 2011 Newcomers Race, Wayne Hamilton died in an accident at the 13th Milestone while in 3rd place of the 2011 Junior Manx Grand Prix and the veteran competitor Adam Easton crashed fatally at Lambfell Cottage during the 500 cc Classic Race.

A revised race format for the 2011 Manx Grand Prix with the introduction of a new 650 cc Super-Twin race and the reworking of the Classic Bike racing regulations by the race organisers, the Manx Motor-Cycle Club Committee (MMCC) and the Isle of Man Department of Community, Culture & Leisure. Improvements to the race structure include increased competitor safety with each race limited to a maximum of 90 entries. The practice of competitors starting in 'pairs' has been abandoned for the Isle of Man TT race practice of riders starting singly at 10 second intervals.

Practice Times

2011 Senior Manx Grand Prix Practice Times & Leaderboard

 Plates; Black on Yellow.

2011 Junior Manx Grand Prix Practice Times & Leaderboard

 Plates; White numbers on Blue.

2011 Junior Classic Practice Times and Leaderboard

 Plates; Black digits on White race plates.
 Class A Classic Machines 300 cc–350 cc

2011 500 cc Classic Practice Times and Leaderboard

 Plates; White digits on Black race plates.
 Classic Machines 351 cc–500 cc

2011 Supertwin Practice Times and Leaderboard

 Plates; White digits on Green race plates.
 Machines 201 cc–650 cc

2011 Lightweight Practice Times & Leaderboard 

 Plates; White digits on Green race plates.
 Machines 201 cc–400 cc

2011 Classic Superbike Practice Times and Leaderboard

 Plates; Black digits on orange race plates.
 Classic Machines 351 cc–500 cc

Race Results

Race 1a; Newcomers Race 'A'
Saturday 27 August 2011 Mountain Course 3 laps – 113.00 miles
 Class A
 550 cc–750 cc Four-stroke Four-cylinder motorcycles.
 651 cc–1000 cc Four-stroke Twin-cylinder motorcycles.
 601 cc–675 cc Four-stroke Three-cylinder motorcycles.
 601 cc–1000 cc Rotary motorcycles.
 201 cc–450 cc Two-stroke Twin-cylinder motorcycles

Fastest Lap: William Davidson – 114.351 mph (19' 47.81)

Race 1a; Newcomers Race 'B'
Saturday 27 August 2011 Mountain Course 3 laps – 113.00 miles (182.16 km)
 Class B
 Up to 125 cc Two-stroke Single-cylinder motorcycles 6 gears maximum.
 251 cc–400 cc Four-stroke Four-cylinder motorcycles.
 Up to 650 cc Four-stroke Twin-cylinder motorcycles.

Fastest Lap: Anthony Porter – 101.197 mph (22' 22.22)

Race 2a; 350 cc Junior Classic Race
Monday 29 August 2011 Mountain Course 4 laps – 150.92 miles (242.80 km)
 For motorcycles exceeding 300 cc and not exceeding 351 cc

Fastest Lap; Ryan Farquhar 99.908 mph (22 minutes 99.908 secs)

Race 2b; Lightweight Classic Race
Monday 29 August 2011 – Mountain Course 4 laps – 150.92 miles (242.80 km)
 For motorcycles exceeding 175 cc and not exceeding 250 cc

Fastest Lap; Ewan Hamilton 91.204 mph (24 minutes 49.27 secs)

Race 3; Junior Manx Grand Prix
Monday 29 August 2011 Mountain Course 4 laps – 150.92 miles (242.80 km)
 201 cc–250 cc Two-stroke Two-cylinder motorcycles.
 550 cc–600 cc Four-stroke Four-cylinder motorcycles.
 601 cc–675 cc Four-stroke Three-cylinder motorcycles.
 651 cc–750 cc Four-stroke Two-cylinder motorcycles.

Fastest Lap; Dennis Booth 111.128 mph (20 minutes 22.27 secs)

Race 4; 500 cc Classic Race
Wednesday 31 August 2011 Mountain Course 4 laps – 150.92 miles (242.80 km)
 For classic motorcycles exceeding 351 cc and not exceeding 500 cc

Fastest Lap: Ryan Farquhar – 107.378 mph (21 minutes 04.95 secs)

Race 4b; Formula Classic Race
Wednesday 31 August 2011 Mountain Course 4 laps – 150.92 miles (242.80 km)
 For motorcycles exceeding 501 cc and not exceeding 750 cc

Fastest Lap; Chris McGahan 100.276 mph (22 minutes 34.55 secs)

Race 5; Supertwin Race
Wednesday 31 August 2011 Mountain Course 4 laps – 150.92 miles (242.80 km)
 For motorcycles exceeding 201 cc and not exceeding 650 cc Two-stroke Twin-cylinder motorcycles

Fastest Lap: Dave Moffitt – 109.547 mph (20 minutes 39.91 secs)

Race 5b; Lightweight Race 
Wednesday 31 August 2011 Mountain Course 4 laps – 150.92 miles (242.80 km)
 Two-stroke motorcycles up to 125 cc, 6 gears maximum.
 Four-stroke motorcycles 251 cc–401 cc

Fastest Lap: Alistair Haworth – 105.397 mph (21 minutes 28.73 secs)

Race 6; Senior Manx Grand Prix 
Friday 2 September 2011 Mountain Course 4 laps – 150.92 miles (242.80 km)
 Four-stroke Four-cylinder motorcycles exceeding 550 cc and not exceeding 750 cc.
 Four-stroke Twin-cylinder motorcycles exceeding 651 cc and not exceeding 1000 cc.
 Four-stroke Three-cylinder motorcycles exceeding 601 cc and not exceeding 675 cc.

Fastest Lap; Grant Wagstaff 117.429 mph (19 minutes 16.68 secs).

Race 7a; Classic Superbike Race
Friday 2 August 2011 Mountain Course 4 laps – 150.92 miles (242.80 km)
 Class A
 Classic Machines 601 cc-1050 cc Four-stroke motorcycles.
 351 cc-750 cc Two-stroke motorcycles.

Fastest Lap; Ryan Farquhar 116.574 mph (19 minutes 25.17 secs)

Race 7b; Junior Post Classic Race
Friday 2 August 2011 Mountain Course 4 laps – 150.92 miles (242.80 km)
 Class B
 126 cc-250 cc Two-stroke Cylinder Grand Prix/Standard motorcycles.
 251 cc-350 cc Two-stroke Cylinder standard motorcycles.
 Up to 600cccc Four-stroke Cylinder motorcycles.
 For motorcycles exceeding 175 cc and not exceeding 250 cc

Fastest Lap; Roy Richardson 111.161 mph (20 minutes 21.91 secs)

Gallery

Sources

External links
 Detailed race results

2011
Grand Prix
2011 in British motorsport
2011 in motorcycle sport
August 2011 sports events in the United Kingdom
September 2011 sports events in the United Kingdom